"Forget Me Not" is the third episode of the Once Upon a Time spin-off series Once Upon a Time in Wonderland.

Plot
With the Genie's bottle in her clutches, the Red Queen sends the Bandersnatch after Alice since Jafar needs her in order to use Cyrus (who is discovered to have contacted her). Alice and the Knave of Hearts head to the house of the Grendel in the Whispering Woods to obtain the Forget-Me-Knot so that they can find out who stole Cyrus's bottle before Jafar could steal it. In the Knave of Hearts's flashback, it is shown that he joined up with Robin Hood's Merry Men back when he was Will Scarlet. It is also revealed that Wonderland's Red Queen was once his love Anastasia.

Production
Richard Hatem was the writer for the episode, while David Solomon was its director.

Reception

Ratings
The episode was watched by 4.38 million American viewers, and received an 18-49 rating/share of 1.1/4, down from the previous episode. The show placed fifth in its timeslot and thirteenth for the night.

Critical reception
Amy Ratcliffe of IGN gave the episode a 7.2 out of 10, giving it a positive review. She said "Overall, this episode wasn't the strongest but there was plenty to enjoy. The reveal of Anastasia's identity opens the doors to plenty of stories, the most obvious one being how and why she betrayed the Knave. I'm dying to know how she stepped into the Red Queen's elegant shoes. The Alice and Cyrus story was the undercurrent in this episode, and it's good to know they're willing to put the main plot in the backseat from time to time."

Christine Orlando of TV Fanatic gave the episode a 4.3 out of 5, signaling positive reviews.

Hillary Busis of Entertainment Weekly gave the episode a mixed to negative review, despite giving a positive comment about the chemistry between Lowe and Socha. She said:

References

External links
 

2013 American television episodes
Once Upon a Time in Wonderland episodes